Herbert Niel Randle C.I.E. F.B.A. (1880–1973), commonly known as "H. N. Randle", was the librarian of the India Office Library (1933–49; assistant librarian 1927–33), professor of philosophy at Queen's College, Benares and a writer on Indian philosophy.

His son, John Niel Randle, was posthumously awarded a Victoria Cross for valour at the Battle of Kohima in 1944.

References 

1880 births
1973 deaths
British Indologists